Ephemera, is an album by baritone saxophonist Pepper Adams which was recorded in London in 1973 and originally released on the Spotlite label.

Reception

The Allmusic review by Scott Yanow states "Adams performs four of his obscure originals (most memorable is the melodic title cut), Thad Jones' "Quiet Lady," "Jitterbug Waltz" and a romping version of Bud Powell's classic "Bouncing With Bud." A fine example of the deep-toned baritonist at his best. ".

Track listing
All compositions by Pepper Adams except where noted.
 "Ephemera" – 7:15
 "Bouncing with Bud" (Bud Powell) – 10:55
 "Civilization and Its Discontents" – 6:11
 "Jitterbug Waltz" (Fats Waller) – 6:17
 "Quiet Lady" (Thad Jones) – 9:23
 "Patrice" – 6:09
 "Hellure (How Are You're)" – 4:56

Personnel
Pepper Adams – baritone saxophone
Roland Hanna – piano
George Mraz – bass
Mel Lewis – drums

References

Pepper Adams albums
1974 albums
Spotlite Records albums